The Grand Canyon 24 hour Ultra Marathon is a 24-hour ultramarathon that takes the participants through one of the most striking environments on earth, the Grand Canyon. The race took place for the first time in October, 2010. The race takes participants out on the North Rim of the Grand Canyon, the much less visited area of the Canyon.

The race is a  race in 24 hours, similar to the Namibian ultra marathon. The runners are self-reliant during the race and have to carry all food and water with them. There are water stations during the route where water can be filled up.

The distance is the same as three standard marathons.

See also
Ultramarathon
Marathon
Marathon Des Sables or MdS

External links
More information about the Grand Canyon 24hours Ultra Marathon
2008 Race report

Ultramarathons in the United States